Mahmoodabad Assembly constituency is one of the 403 constituencies of the Uttar Pradesh Legislative Assembly, India. It is a part of the Sitapur  district and one of the five assembly constituencies in the Sitapur Lok Sabha constituency. First election in this assembly constituency was held in 1962 after the "DPACO (1961)" (delimitation order) was passed in 1961. After the "Delimitation of Parliamentary and Assembly Constituencies Order" was passed in 2008, the constituency was assigned identification number 151.

Wards  / Areas
Extent of Mahmoodabad Assembly constituency is KCs Pahla, Mahmoodabad, Mahmoodabad MB, Paitepur NP, PCs Sadarpur, Bilauli Nan Kari, Rajparapur, Hajipur,  Bajehra, Pokhara Kala, Sultanapur, Bhudkuda, Aiwapur, Dharampur, Lalpur,  Khapura, Ahibanpur, Angethuwa, Pipari, Dhakhwa, Kodaura & Rasulabad of Sadarpur KC of Mahmoodabad Tehsil.

Members of the Legislative Assembly

16th Vidhan Sabha: 2012 General Elections

See also

Sitapur district
Sitapur Lok Sabha constituency
Sixteenth Legislative Assembly of Uttar Pradesh
Uttar Pradesh Legislative Assembly
Vidhan Bhawan

References

External links
 

Assembly constituencies of Uttar Pradesh
Politics of Sitapur district